Camp may refer to:

Outdoor accommodation and recreation
 Campsite or campground, a recreational outdoor sleeping and eating site
 a temporary settlement for nomads
 Camp, a term used in New England, Northern Ontario and New Brunswick to describe a cottage
 Military camp
 Summer camp, typically organized for groups of children or youth
 Tent city, a housing facility often occupied by homeless people or protesters

Areas of imprisonment or confinement 
 Concentration camp
 Extermination camp
 Federal prison camp, a minimum-security United States federal prison facility  
 Internment camp, also called a concentration camp, resettlement camp, relocation camp, or detention camp
 Labor camp
 Prisoner-of-war camp
 Parole camp guards its own soldiers as prisoners of war

Gatherings of people
 Camp, a mining community
 Camp, a term commonly used in the titles of technology-related unconferences
 Camp meeting, a Christian gathering which originated in 19th-century America
 Protest camp a base for protest or obstruction by physically blocking a site
 Refugee camp or displaced persons camp, a temporary encampment of people who have had to leave their country due to war or other disasters

Places and areas
 Câmp (disambiguation), two villages in Romania
 Camp (Falkland Islands), a term used in the Falkland Islands to refer to any part of the islands outside of the islands' only significant town, Stanley
 Camp (constituency), electoral constituency in the Legislative Assembly of the Falkland Islands
 Camp, County Kerry, a village on the Dingle Peninsula, in the Republic of Ireland
Camp, Ohio, a community in the United States
Camp County, Texas, a county in the United States
 Camp Nou, home stadium of FC Barcelona
 Central Atlantic magmatic province, or CAMP, a large geological formation in northwestern Africa, southwestern Europe, northeastern South America and southeastern North America

People
 Camp (surname)

Arts, entertainment, and media

Fashion 
 Camp (style)
 Camp: Notes on Fashion, a 2019 exhibition at the Metropolitan Museum of Art

Films
 Camp (1965 film), a 1965 underground film directed by Andy Warhol
 Camp (2003 film), a 2003 independent film written and directed by Todd Graff about an upstate New York performing arts summer camp

Literature
 Camp (novel), a 2020 young adult novel by L.C. Rosen

Music
 Camp (album), a 2011 album from rapper Childish Gambino
 Camp Records, a 1960s record label that specialized in producing gay-themed novelty records and singles
 "Camp", a song by Tired Lion from the 2017 album Dumb Days

Television
 Camp (TV series), a 2013 American television series

Military and athletics
 Boot camp (disambiguation)
 Cantonment
 Military camp
 Training camp

Other uses
 Camp (style), an ironic appreciation of that which might otherwise be considered outlandish or corny, or in British English, effeminate male homosexual mannerisms and speech
 Camp Coffee, a concentrated coffee-flavoured syrup
 T.H. Camp (shipwreck), a Lake Superior shipwreck off the coast of Wisconsin

See also

 Boot camp (disambiguation)
 The Camp (disambiguation)
 CAMP (disambiguation), including cAMP and camP
 Câmp (disambiguation), two villages in Romania
 Camper (disambiguation)
 Camping (disambiguation)
 Camps (disambiguation)
 Campus
 Campy (disambiguation)
 Kemp (disambiguation)